Slush pump can mean:
In petroleum engineering, a pump used to circulate the drilling fluid during rotary drilling
Slang for automatic transmission
Slang for trombone, a brass musical instrument

See also
Slush (disambiguation)